Ben Johnson House may refer to:

 Ben Johnson House (Bardstown, Kentucky), listed on the NRHP in Kentucky
 Ben Johnson House (Flemingsburg Junction, Kentucky), listed on the NRHP in Kentucky